Mehdi Sahnoune (born May 5, 1976) is a French former professional boxer.

Known as "Kounet", Sahnoune turned pro in 1997 and challenged WBA Light Heavyweight Title holder Bruno Girard in 2003, winning the belt by TKO. He lost the belt in his first defense to Silvio Branco later that year. In 2005 he got another shot at a major belt, the WBO Light Heavyweight Title, against Zsolt Erdei, but he lost via TKO in the 12th round.

Criminal charges
Sahnoune was sentenced to a three-year prison term for allegedly participating in a battery on a man outside a nightclub in Aix-en-Provence, France.

References

External links
 

1976 births
French sportspeople of Algerian descent
Living people
Sportspeople from Marseille
World boxing champions
French male boxers
Light-heavyweight boxers